Shihab Houna Murad (born 1 January 1968) is an Iraqi long-distance runner. He competed in the men's 5000 metres at the 2000 Summer Olympics.

References

1968 births
Living people
Athletes (track and field) at the 2000 Summer Olympics
Iraqi male long-distance runners
Olympic athletes of Iraq
Place of birth missing (living people)